The Gibson Victory Bass was an electric bass guitar produced by Gibson Guitars from 1981 until 1986. It was a bass guitar variant of the Gibson Victory. It was not a successful model.

Models
The Victory Bass was only available as a four-string solid-body bass guitar.  The scale was 34″, body made of maple and neck was three-ply maple with rosewood fingerboard. A fret-less version was an option. Three models of Victory Basses were produced:

 Standard - one Series VIIIB humbucker, three-ply maple neck, 24-fret rosewood fretboard, and passive electronics with one volume and one tone knob and a series/parallel switch.
 Custom - two Series VIIIB humbuckers, three-ply maple neck, 24-fret rosewood fretboard, and passive electronics with one volume and one tone knob, bass and treble controls, a pickup selector switch, and a series/parallel switch.
 Artist - two Series VIIIB humbuckers, three-ply maple neck, 24-fret rosewood fretboard, and passive/active electronics with one volume and one tone knob, bass and treble controls, a pickup selector switch, a series/parallel switch, and a three-position passive/active switch.

Prices 
In the used market the can go from $600 to $1600.

External sources 

 Manual at vintageguitarandbass.com

References 

Victory Bass